Băbeni may refer to several places in Romania:

Băbeni, a town in Vâlcea County
Băbeni, Sălaj, a commune in Sălaj County
Băbeni, a village in Topliceni Commune, Buzău County
Băbeni-Olteţu, a village in Diculești Commune, Vâlcea County